XHCMS-FM is a radio station on 105.5 FM in Mexicali, Baja California, Mexico. The station is owned by Grupo Imagen and carries its Imagen Radio news/talk format.

History
XHCMS received its first concession on March 30, 1994. It was owned by Carlos Armando Madrazo y Pintado and located in Ciudad Morelos. MVS Radio, which bought all of Madrazo y Pintado's stations, would sell XHCMS to Imagen in 2004.

References

1994 establishments in Mexico
Radio stations established in 1994
Radio stations in Mexicali
Grupo Imagen
Spanish-language radio stations